Rugby sevens, for the 2013 Bolivarian Games, took place from 17 November to 19 November 2013.

Medal summary

References

forma

Events at the 2013 Bolivarian Games
2013 rugby sevens competitions
2013 Bolivarian Games